Untitled or (Untitled) may refer to:

Artworks
 Untitled (2004), by Banksy
 Untitled (1982 painting), by American artist Jean-Michel Basquiat
 Untitled (Devil), a 1982 painting by American artist Jean-Michel Basquiat
 Untitled (Fishing), a 1981 painting by American artist Jean-Michel Basquiat
 Untitled (1981 Head), a 1981 painting by American artist Jean-Michel Basquiat
 Untitled (The Birth), a 1938 tempera painting by American artist Jacob Lawrence
 Untitled (Black on Grey), a 1970 painting by Mark Rothko
 Untitled (Hoosier mural), a 1972 outdoor mural by Peter Mayer
 Untitled (IUPUI Letters), a 2008 public sculpture the New York City firm Two Twelve
 Untitled (Jazz Musicians), a 1995 outdoor sculpture by John Spaulding
 Untitled (Jeffersonville), a 1970 public artwork by Barney Bright
 Untitled (landscape), an 1883–1911 drawing by Carl Fredrik Hill
 Untitled (L's), a 1980 public sculpture by David Von Schlegell
 "Untitled" (Perfect Lovers), a 1987–1990 and 1991 found object sculpture by Félix González-Torres
 Untitled (Pope), a c. 1954 panel painting by Francis Bacon
 Untitled (Urban Wall), a 1973 mural by Austrian artist Roland Hobart
 Untitled (Richard Fleischner artwork at Alewife station), a 1985 public art installation in Massachusetts
 Untitled (1995 painting by Ellen Gallagher), a painting in Boston, Massachusetts
 Untitled (1996 painting by Ellen Gallagher), a painting in Los Angeles
 Untitled (1998 painting by Ellen Gallagher), a painting in Edinburgh, UK
 Untitled (1999 painting by Ellen Gallagher), a painting in Chicago
 Untitled (Gordin), a 1969 bronze sculpture
 Untitled (Hardy), a 1952 fountain and sculpture
 Untitled (1981 painting by Clementine Hunter), a painting in Washington, D.C.
 Untitled (1967 Judd sculpture), a sculpture by Donald Judd in Indianapolis
 Untitled (Evans), a 1972 sculpture by Garth Evans
 Untitled (Ellsworth Kelly), a 1986 steel sculpture in Washington, DC
 Untitled (Lee Kelly, 1973), a sculpture in Olympia
 Untitled (Lee Kelly, 1975), a sculpture in Seattle
 Untitled (Killmaster), a 1977 steel and porcelain enamel sculpture
 Untitled (Krol), a 1973 public artwork by Ronald W. Krol
 Untitled (McMakin), a 2004–2007 sculpture
 Untitled (Morrison), a 1977 painted aluminum sculpture
 Untitled (Rosati), a 1976 public art work by James Rosati
 Untitled (Rothko), a 1952 painting
 Untitled (Rückriem), a 1987 granite sculpture
 Untitled (Shapiro, 1989), a 1989 bronze abstract sculpture by Joel Shapiro
 Untitled (Shapiro, 1990), a 1990 sculpture
 Untitled (West), a 1977 steel sculpture

Film and television
 (Untitled) (2009 film), a comedy starring Adam Goldberg and Marley Shelton
 Untitled (2011 film), a horror film by Shaun Troke
 Untitled, a 2001 cut of the 2000 film Almost Famous
 "Untitled", an episode of Six Feet Under
 "Untitled", an episode of Law & Order
 "Untitled", an episode of Monty Python's Flying Circus
 "Untitled" (Space Ghost Coast to Coast), a television episode

Music

Albums

 Untitled (Arashi album) (2017)
 Untitled (The Armed album) (2015)
 Untitled (Bass Communion Box) (2014)
 (Untitled) (The Byrds album) (1970)
 Untitled (Five Pointe O album) (2002)
 Untitled (Jack DeJohnette album) (1976)
 Untitled (Led Zeppelin album) (1971)
 Untitled (Marc and the Mambas album) (1982)
 Untitled (mewithoutYou album), (2018)
 Untitled (R. Kelly album) (2009)
 Untitled (The Rembrandts album) (1992)
 Untitled (Terri Walker album) (2003)
 Untitled (Wintersleep album) (2005)
 Untitled (Black Is), by Sault (2020)
 Untitled (God), by Sault (2022)
 Untitled (Rise), by Sault (2020)
 Untitled, by Dälek (2010)
 Untitled, by Demarco (2008)

EPs
 Untitled (Hodgy Beats EP) (2012)
 Untitled (Thought Forms and Esben and the Witch EP) (2014)
 Untitled (Scoop), by the Notwist (2002)
 Untitled (Selections from 12), by the Notwist (1997)

Songs
"Untitled (How Does It Feel)", a 2000 song by D'Angelo from Voodoo
"Untitled (How Could This Happen to Me?)", a 2004 song by Simple Plan from Still Not Getting Any...
"Untitled" (The Smashing Pumpkins song), a 2001 song by Smashing Pumpkins
"Untitled", a 1997 song by Blink-182 from Dude Ranch
"Untitled", a 2006 song by Brand New from The Devil and God Are Raging Inside Me
"Untitled", a 1995 song by Collective Soul from Collective Soul
"Untitled", a 2011 song by Matt Corby, from Into the Flame
"Untitled", a 1993 song by Crash Test Dummies from God Shuffled His Feet
"Untitled", a 1989 song by the Cure from Disintegration
"Untitled", a 2007 song by Dance Gavin Dance from Downtown Battle Mountain
"Untitled", a 1996 song by DJ Shadow from Endtroducing.....
"Untitled", a 2010 song by Eminem from Recovery
"Untitled", a 2011 song by Eyes Set to Kill from White Lotus
"Untitled", a 2002 song by Finch from What It Is to Burn
"Untitled", a 2002 song by Five Pointe O from Untitled
"Untitled", a 1998 song by Fuel from Sunburn
"Untitled", a 2001 song by Fugazi from The Argument
"Untitled", a 2011 song by the Gazette from Toxic
"Untitled", a 2002 song by Interpol from Turn On the Bright Lights
"Untitled", a 2012 song by Killer Mike from R.A.P. Music
"Untitled", a 2015 song by Knuckle Puck from Copacetic
"Untitled", a 1990 song by the Lemonheads from Lovey
"Untitled", a 1995 song by Marilyn Manson from Smells Like Children
"Untitled", a 2003 hidden track by Matchbook Romance from Stories and Alibis
"Untitled", a 1998 song by Neutral Milk Hotel from In the Aeroplane Over the Sea
"Untitled", a 1999 song by O.A.R. from Soul's Aflame
"Untitled", a 1991 song by Orbital from Orbital
"Untitled", a 2006 song by the Panic Channel from One
"Untitled", a 1998 song by Pearl Jam from Live on Two Legs
"Untitled", a 2007 song by Pig Destroyer from Phantom Limb
"Untitled", a 2000 hidden track by Radiohead from Kid A
"Untitled", a 1988 song by R.E.M. from Green
"Untitled", a 1985 song by Shockabilly from Heaven
"Untitled", a 1998 song by Silverchair from Godzilla: The Album
"Untitled", a 2004 song by Six by Seven from 04
"Untitled", a 2001 song by Songs: Ohia from Travels in Constants
"Untitled", a 2003 song by Stellastarr from Stellastarr
"Untitled", a 1992 song by Swans from Love of Life
"Untitled", a 1994 song by Unashamed from Silence
"Untitled", a 2004 song by the Wailin' Jennys from 40 Days
"Untitled", a 1995 song by Whiteout from Bite It
"Untitled", a 2010 bonus track by Blonde Redhead from Penny Sparkle
"Untitled", a 2017 song by Rex Orange County from Apricot Princess
"Untitled", a 1997 song by London After Midnight from Oddities
"Untitled", a 2021 song by urple, the last song in the EP Bored in Canada

Other uses
Untitled (publication), a serial publication of the Friends of Photography from 1972–1994

See also
 
 Untilted, an album by Autechre
 Jane Doe (disambiguation)
 John Doe (disambiguation)
 John Smith (disambiguation)
 List of untitled musical works
 Nameless (disambiguation)
 No Name (disambiguation)
 Self-titled (disambiguation)